Kaloopasana is a 1981 Indian Malayalam film,  directed by Ahwan Sebastian. The film stars Jagathy Sreekumar, Venu Nagavally, Augustine and Prajatha in the lead roles. The film has musical score by K. Raghavan.

Cast
Jagathy Sreekumar
Venu Nagavally
Augustine
Prajatha
Ramani
Vani

Soundtrack
The music was composed by K. Raghavan and the lyrics were written by Poovachal Khader and Chowalloor Krishnankutty.

References

External links
 

1981 films
1980s Malayalam-language films